Heir is an annual British Super Smash Bros. Melee tournament that began in 2014. The event has also featured a Project M tournament on several editions.

History 
The Heir to the Thrones tournament series began on the weekend of August 28, 2014, in Birmingham. It featured Super Smash Bros.Melee, Project M, and Super Smash Bros.Brawl.

Heir II The Throne was held on the weekend of August 14, 2015, in Nottingham. The Project M tournament was the biggest in European history, and the whole competition attracted players from 13 different countries.

Heir 3 was won by Armada again, followed by American players The Moon and ChuDat.

Heir 4 was deemed to be the last in the series, and only featured Super Smash Bros. Melee. It was held on August 17–21, 2017, at the university of Nottingham. The tournament format didn't change: first, a night out on the Thursday, then side events such as international crew battles on the Friday, and finally the main tournament on the weekend. During the crew battles, Sweden won the competition. Leffen won the Singles tournament, beating American player S2J and Spanish player Trif.

In 2018, Heir 5 was organised with a high emphasis on its grassroot identity. Beer cans and pizza boxes made up the biggest part of communication tools. The tournament was moved to the university of Leicester. With 752 players, it was the largest Super Smash Bros. Melee tournament in European history and it sold out in under 12 hours. Armada dropped out from the tournament in Singles, blaming a burn-out due to the "Summer of Smash". Leffen considered doing the same, but then took part in the tournament, which he won, beating American players Westballz and S2J.

Results 
Melee Singles
 2014: 1st: Fuzzyness, 2nd: Vanity Angel, 3rd: Professor Pro
 2015: 1st: Armada, 2nd: Lucky, 3rd: Tekk
 2016: 1st: Armada, 2nd: The Moon, 3rd: ChuDat
 2017: 1st: Leffen, 2nd: S2J, 3rd: Trif
 2018: 1st: Leffen, 2nd: Westballz, 3rd: S2J

References 

Super Smash Bros. tournaments
2014 establishments in the United Kingdom